Der Pass (English: The Pass) or Pagan Peak is an Austrian-German television crime drama series which premiered on Sky Deutschland on 25 January 2019. It was inspired by season 1 of the Danish-Swedish series, Broen  Bron (English:The Bridge). Criminal profiler  advised on aspects of police procedures. The action is set largely in the Austria-Germany border area from Traunstein to Salzburg. In the first season of eight episodes, two detectives, German Ellie (Julia Jentsch) and Gedeon from Austria, hunt a serial killer, Gregor (Franz Hartwig), who is using a Krampus mask as a disguise. The pilot episode, "Finsternis" (English: "Darkness"), had its world premiere on 21 September 2018 at the Tribeca TV Festival, ahead of the full series broadcast. Its Austrian debut was at the Urania Cinema, Vienna, on 15 January 2019, and its German premiere at Gloria-Palast, Munich, on the following day.

Season 2 of Der Pass, also of eight episodes, commenced broadcasting on 21 January 2022. In this season, Ellie and Gedeon investigate when female corpses are found in the border area.

Premise 

Season 1
Gedeon and Ellie attend a corpse at the border. It is the first victim of a serial killer, Gregor, who wears Krampus masks. Gregor warns "The Red Season Is Coming." Gedeon alerts authorities of Gregor's imminent bombing of a shopping mall; a child is killed. Tech-savvy Gregor hacks into Ellie's computer to stay ahead of the investigation. A copycat suspect is killed by police and authorities close the case. A year later, Gedeon is unconvinced and persuades Ellie to search for another victim. Gregor has moved next door to Ellie. He poisons both her and himself before being arrested. Gedeon saves Ellie's life.

Season 2
A year later, Ellie mentors junior detective, Yela, who is joined by Gedeon, as a police advisor. They investigate another serial killer, Xandi, who tortures female victims. Both Ellie and Gedeon are recovering from traumas. Xandi is protected by his older brother, Wolfgang, the family's employee, Manni ( and investigating chief detective, Manuel (.

Cast 

 Julia Jentsch as Ellie Stocker: Traunstein senior detective inspector, enthusiastic and thorough, has an affair with Claas, her boss
  as Gedeon Winter or "Falcon": Salzburg detective inspector, cynical, dissolute and corrupt, nevertheless becomes fixated on catching the "Krampus killer"
 Franz Hartwig as Gregor Ansbach/"David Zeller": self-sufficient survivalist, tech-savvy, uses Krampus legends for his own ends, poses as David to become Ellie's neighbour
 Hanno Koffler as Claas Wallinger: Traunstein police commissioner, Ellie's superior, has an affair with Ellie
  as Sebastian Brunner: doomsdayer/survivalist, Six Brothers cult leader, styles himself as "Cernunnos"
 Nataša Petrović as Milica Andov: illegal Macedonian refugee, mountain inn employee exploited by her boss, Sara
 Lucas Gregorowicz as Charles Turek: Munich newspaper sensationalist reporter, writes a book on the Krampus killer
  as Christian Ressler: Austrian criminal profiler and case analyst
  as Adam Litkowski: Salzburg detective on Gedeon's squad, promoted to inspector
  as Louisa Baumgartner: woman missing for three months, found imprisoned and beaten at Six Brothers cult, remains loyal to Sebastian
 Victoria Trauttmansdorff as Johanna Stadlober: Salzburg police commander, Gedeon's boss
  as Jörg Hässmann: political candidate for governor
  as Sven Rieger: police task force's IT investigator
  as Dalia Blani: police task force investigator, organises Dat.Sec's interviews
  as Joy: popular blogger on fashion and make-up, dates Rafael
  as Rafael Conrad: heir to the Conrad family financial empire, dates Joy
  as Thomas Braun: Ellie's deputy
  as Widmann: Police Commissioner, replaces Claas, becomes Ellie's new boss
  as Martina Bartl: Munich newspaper editor, Charles' boss
  as Joseph Klein: Bavarian Interior Minister, restructures task force
  as Sara Körner: innkeeper, exploits Milica
  as Fred: mountain inn employee
  as Karim: Califati's henchman
  as Felix Riffeser/"Manus": Sebastian's right-hand man at Six Brothers cult
  as Johannes Tischler: cyber-security company Dat.Sec's owner, employs Gregor
 Reinhold G. Moritz as Hahn: ex-inspector, worked on Tischler's murder case
 Ernst Stötzner as Wolfgang Stocker: retired Traunstein city official, part-time hunter, Ellie's father
 Norbert E. Lex as Dominik Gross: head of Ortus Foundation, unscrupulous businessman, has an affair with his employee, Nuria
 Anna Sophie Krenn as Nuria Garido: Munich-based Spanish interpreter at Ortus Foundation, mistress of Dominik
  as Staatsanwalt Svoboda: Vienna public prosecutor, investigating Gedeon and Califati
  as Chingiz Tajmanov or "Califati": Viennese crime lord, bribed Gedeon for information
  as Vincenz Lang: Krampus mask maker, witness
 Jelena Jovanova as Ivana Andov: Milica's sister, who confirms Milica's identity
  as Miriam Tander: bomb victim's mother

Season 2 cast 

Credits:
  as Yela Antic: Traunstein police investigator, mentored by Ellie
  as Alexander "Xandi" Gössen: wannabe piano virtuoso, younger brother of Wolfgang, who hunts, tortures and kills women
  as Wolfgang Gössen: economic manager of Gössen family company, protective older brother of Xandi
  as Manni Krois: hunter, taxidermist, works for the Gössens, instructs Xandi in folklore and preparing deer corpses
  as Manuel Riffeser: Salzburg detective chief inspector, in charge of Tonia's and subsequent murder investigations, corrupted by Wolfgang's minions
  as Alina Reichelt: anonymous help-line psychologist, contacted by Xandi
 Ben Felipe as Tom Neuner: Traunstein police officer, works with Yela
  as Laura Berger: Wolfgang's former girlfriend, in a come for five years
  as Konstantin Vogas: heavily disfigured, wildlife photographer
 Gabriela Garcia Vargas as Rebecca Afarid: Gössens' employee, becomes Wolfgang's current girlfriend
  as Ben Heller: Salzburg police detective, Manuel's subordinate
 Alexander Stecher as Oskar Maria Koschlik: notable, modern visual artist, alleged pedophile, investigated by Gedeon several years ago
 Marie Sophie von Reibnitz as Tonia Roth: 18-year-old German cyclist and camper, visiting Austria, one of Xandi's first murder victims
 ? as Miriam Zänger: cross-country skier, one of Xandi's early murder victims
  as Clara Sidorow: prostitute, paid by Xandi to scream, later becomes another of his murder victims
  as Natalia Stanner: horticulturist, who is kidnapped, raped and tortured by Xandi
 Agnieszka Salamon as Jenny: Gössens' estate housekeeper
  as Daniela Berger: Laura's mother
  as Alfons Holzmann: farmer, Xandi's neighbor, one of Xandi's last murder victims
 Rina Juniku as Rosalie Jonas: woman, paid off by Wolfgang to attend orgies, later a witness against the Gössens
 Lisa-Maria Sommerfeld as Lisa Hildebrandt: nurse's daughter, suspect in Ms Fischerauer's murder

Episode guide

Season 1

Season 2

Production 

Co-creator  acknowledged that Der Pass was inspired by the 2011 Danish-Swedish series, Broen  Bron (English:The Bridge) and oboserved, "Apart from the premise of two countries working together and finding a body on the border, everything else is pretty much a completely new story." The creators researched serial killers, including their online interviews, in developing the character of Gregor Ansbach (Franz Hartwig). The process was assisted by criminal profiler, . Unusually for a crime drama the antagonist, Gregor is revealled early in the series and has a more visible presence. Another deliberate effort is the evolution of both protagonists, Gedeon starts as a jaded, cynical and corrupt officer who becomes dedicated to catching Gregor and protective of Ellie. Meanwhile, Ellie was a committed, enthusiastic and by-the-book officer who becomes a rule breaker, slightly burned-out and traumatised. Stennart described Ellie's character as difficult to write, "[one] who is truly good but also interesting,”

Filming of Der Pass occurred from November 2017 to April 2018 in both Austria and Germany, at Bad Gastein, Berchtesgaden, Graz, Söcking, Vienna, Grundlsee and Sportgastein. It was co-produced by the Austrian Epo-Film and the German Wiedemann & Berg Film Production, which was supported by the FilmFernsehFonds Bayern, the Fernsehfonds Austria, the film funding of the state of Salzburg, the CINESTYRIA Filmcommission and Fonds and the Film Commission Graz.

The second season filming began in January 2020, however, it was delayed by restrictions due to the COVID-19 pandemic and resumed in April and continued intermittently to December 2020. For this season, Stennert described how, "It's so interesting to see how someone becomes a perpetrator in the first place. So this time we wanted to start following this guy before the first corpse." Broadcasting started on 21 January 2022 on Sky Deutschland and ZDF.

Reception 

Ray Flook of Bleeding Cool reviewed the pilot episode of Pagan Peak, which depicts "crime scenes with symbolically posed victims, reminiscent of pagan rituals." Die Presses Anna-Marie Wallner observed the series title, Der Pass, has multiple meanings, both the geographical location between Austria and Germany and the annual festival group of St Nicholas, Krampus and the Angel. Wallner praised the "courageous and rather unusual" storyline, where the villain is revealed to the audience in episode 3 while "tension nevertheless persists." Der Spiegels Oliver Kaever felt, "It is about isolation, the power of the Internet and digital surveillance fantasies... [and] the enormously spreading grief here that man is a wolf to man. And the world is not a place that forgives."

References

External links 

 Der Pass via Sky Deutschland (in German)
 

2019 German television series debuts
German-language television shows
Television shows filmed in Austria
Television shows filmed in Germany